Artur Cederborgh (30 December 1885 – 15 April 1961) was a Swedish actor. He appeared in more than 70 films between 1919 and 1957.

Selected filmography

 Synnöve Solbakken (1919)
 The Tales of Ensign Stål (1926)
 The Realm of the Rye (1929)
 Ulla, My Ulla (1930)
 The False Millionaire (1931)
 Tired Theodore (1931)
 The Girl from Värmland (1931)
 Black Roses (1932)
 Lucky Devils (1932)
 The Atlantic Adventure (1934)
 Andersson's Kalle (1934)
 The Boys of Number Fifty Seven (1935)
 The People of Småland (1935)
 65, 66 and I (1936)
 Sara Learns Manners (1937)
 Mother Gets Married (1937)
 Adolf Strongarm (1937)
 Adolf Saves the Day (1938)
 Nothing But the Truth (1939)
 We at Solglantan (1939)
 Oh, What a Boy! (1939)
 The Crazy Family (1940)
 Only a Woman (1941)
 Lasse-Maja (1941)
 How to Tame a Real Man (1941)
 The Ghost Reporter (1941)
 Sun Over Klara (1942)
 Doctor Glas (1942)
 Adventurer (1942)
 Gentleman with a Briefcase (1943)
 She Thought It Was Him (1943)
 The Brothers' Woman (1943)
 In Darkest Smaland (1943)
 My People Are Not Yours (1944)
 The Forest Is Our Heritage (1944)
 Blizzard (1944)
 The Rose of Tistelön (1945)
 Kvarterets olycksfågel (1947)
 Neglected by His Wife (1947)
 The Girl from the Marsh Croft (1947)
 Each Heart Has Its Own Story (1948)
 On These Shoulders (1948)
 Realm of Man (1949)
 The People of Hemsö (1955)
 Getting Married (1955)
 The Minister of Uddarbo (1957)

References

External links

1885 births
1961 deaths
Swedish male stage actors
Swedish male film actors
Swedish male silent film actors
20th-century Swedish male actors
Male actors from Stockholm